Rapid response vehicle,  can mean:

 Nontransporting EMS vehicle, particularly in the New South Wales Ambulance Service and most UK ambulance and air ambulance services
 Fast Response Car
 A police car equipped for pursuit, particularly in the Italian Carabinieri